Ana Paula Machado Renault (born November 22, 1981) is a Brazilian journalist, columnist and television personality.

Career 
Ana Paula started her television career on the sixteenth season of the hit reality show Big Brother Brasil. She joined the show as a contestant, and had a very acclaimed participation at the time because of her strong and tough personality. At the Big Brother house, she debuted a very famous one line "Olha Ela" that went viral in the country. Though her success was huge on the reality show, she got removed from the house after an incident involving one of her housemates.

Shortly after her departure from the reality show, she made a few appearances as an interviewer on the hit show Video Show, on the same television channel. As her popularity continued to grow, Rede Globo invited her to make a guest appearance on the telenovela Haja Coração.

In 2017, as she had no ties with her past TV channel, she signed a contract with UOL to be a web columnist. Her job was to judge and comment on entertainment TV shows, such as the following seasons of Big Brother Brasil.

In September 2018, in order to attend to her fans demand, she joined the tenth season of the reality show A Fazenda, on the television channel Record, was the third one to be evicted. 
After on A Fazenda, she kept working on UOL until 2019.

In early 2020, she decided to create a YouTube Channel to talk about the twentieth season of Big Brother Brasil and to video document some days of her life. In May 2020, she was invited by the television channel SBT to be a regular judge of the entertainment hit show Triturando.

In 2021, she became one of the hosts of the program Fofocalizando, a format similar to that of Triturando.

Filmography

References

External links

1981 births
Living people
People from Belo Horizonte
Brazilian people of French descent
Brazilian journalists
Brazilian women journalists
Brazilian television personalities
Participants in Brazilian reality television series
Brazilian columnists
Brazilian women columnists
Brazilian bloggers
Brazilian women bloggers
21st-century Brazilian women writers
21st-century Brazilian writers
Big Brother (franchise) contestants
Big Brother Brasil